Pasupuleti Ramesh Naidu (1933–1988) was an Indian music composer, multi instrumentalist, and singer, known for his works predominantly in Telugu cinema. He garnered the National Film Award for Best Music Direction for the film Megha Sandesam in 1982. He won three Nandi Awards.

He was associated primarily with directors like Dasari Narayana Rao, Vijaya Nirmala and Jandhyala. His major works include Srivariki Premalekha, Sivaranjani, Ananda Bhairavi , Meghasandesam, and Swayamkrushi.

Early life 
He was born in Kondapalli in Krishna District of Andhra Pradesh, India. At the age of fourteen, under the guidance of B. R. Chopra, Naidu got trained in music instrumentation and orchestration at the music company H. M. V. His debut film as a music director was for the Marathi film Bandval Pahija.

He was first introduced to Telugu movies in Dampatyam by Krishnaveni. He moved to Bombay again and later to Calcutta. He married a [North Indian ( Punjabi] woman, and worked for about ten years for Bengali, Nepali and Oriya films before returning to Telugu films with the movie Amma Mata in 1972.

Awards 
National Film Awards
National Film Award for Best Music Direction – 1982 – Megha Sandesam

Nandi Awards
Bbest Music Director - 1984 - Suvarna Sundari
Best Music Director – 1982 – Megha Sandesam
Bbest Male Playback Singer – 1977 – Chillarakottu Chittemma

Filmography 
Telugu
Dampatyam 1957
Swayamprabha 1957
 Manorama 1959
Amma Maata 1972
Tata Manavadu 1972
Devudu Chesina Manushulu 1973
Ganga Manga 1973
Jeevitam 1973
Meena 1973
Chandana 1974
Bantrotu Bharya 1974
Chaduvu Samskaram 1974
Devadasu 1974
Radhamma Pelli 1974
Devude Gelichaadu 1976
Thoorpu Padamara 1976
Sivaranjani 1978
Kalyani 1979
Mangala Toralanalu 1979
Sangham Chekkina Shilpalu 1979
Chillarakottu Chittemma 1979
Antuleni Vinta Katha 1979
Jayasudha 1980
Hema Hemeelu 1980
Pasupu Parani 1980
Suvarna Sundari 1981
Antam Kaadidi Aarambham 1981
Kotta Neeru 1981
Malle Pandiri 1981
Mudda Mandaram 1981
Prema Sankellu 1982
Meghasandesam 1983
Nelavanka 1983
Rendu Jella Sita 1983
Ananda Bhairavi 1983
Justice Chakravarti 1984
Srivaari Sobhanam 1984
Srivariki Premalekha 1984
Rao Gopal Rao 1984
Sangeeta Samrat 1984
Surya Chandrulu 1985
Mogudu Pellalu 1985
Malle Moggalu 1986
Aha Naa Pellanta 1987
Swayamkrushi 1987

Tamil
Pennukku Yar Kaval 1980

Hindi
Hamlet 1954

Kannada
Dharma Daari Thappithu 1982
Ananda Bhairavi 1983
Ajnathavasa 1984

References

External links 

1933 births
1987 deaths
Film musicians from Andhra Pradesh
Telugu people
Best Music Direction National Film Award winners
20th-century Indian composers
Telugu film score composers